Phoebe bournei is a species of tree up to  tall in the family Lauraceae. It is endemic to China, where it occurs in Fujian, Guangdong, Guangxi, Guizhou, Hainan, Hubei, and Jiangxi provinces. It is threatened by habitat loss. The species is under second-class national protection in China.

References

Endemic flora of China
Trees of China
bournei)
Near threatened plants
Taxonomy articles created by Polbot